Tlacateotl (or Tlacateotzin; ? – 1426 or 1427/28) was the second Tlatoani of the Aztec city of Tlatelolco from 1417 until his death.

Reign 
Under his rule the Tlatelolcas continued to expand their wealth and influence within the valley of Mexico. Through trade and tribute, the city's market grew to include trade in wool, jade and quetzal feathers. Tlacateotl also ordered the removal of sculptures from the ruins of Tula to decorate the growing city.

His reign ended in 1426 or 1427/8 during the succession struggle in Azcapotzalco between Tayatzin and Maxtla. He is recorded as having been stoned to death while traveling by canoe. Maxtla is commonly assumed to have ordered the murder, possibly due to a suspected affair between Tlacateotl and Maxtla's wife. He was succeeded by his grandson, Quauhtlatoa.

Family
He succeeded his father, Quaquapitzahuac, upon his death in 1417. He was a brother of the queens Matlalatzin and Huacaltzintli and grandson of the famous king Tezozomoc. He was also a cousin of Emperor Chimalpopoca and uncle of the prince Tezozomoc.

He was a father of the kings Tezozomoctli and Itzquauhtzin and grandfather of Quauhtlatoa. His wives were called Xiuhtomiyauhtzin and Xiuhcanahualtzin, both of which were his aunts (one on each side).

References

Sources

Tlatoque of Tlatelolco
15th-century monarchs in North America
15th-century indigenous people of the Americas
14th-century births
1426 deaths
1420s deaths